| tries = {{#expr:
 + 3 + 2 + 4 + 2 + 4 + 1 + 7 + 3 + 7 + 1
 + 4 + 4 + 6 + 4 + 1 + 3 + 1 + 2 + 3 + 3
 + 5 + 7 + 5 + 1 + 3 + 5 + 1 + 6 + 1 + 4
 + 2 + 4 + 7 + 4 + 9 + 5 + 6 + 4 + 3 + 2
 + 8 + 1 + 3 + 2 + 0 + 1 + 6 + 4 + 8 + 4
 + 2 + 3 + 3 + 3 + 0 + 2 + 5 + 3 + 1 + 7
 + 4 + 9 + 7 +10 + 3 +10 + 3 + 3 + 5 + 5
 + 1 + 4 + 4 + 1 + 7 + 1 + 2 + 6 + 1 + 6
 + 5 +10 + 6 + 5 + 4 + 2 + 7 + 5 + 3 + 8
 + 3 + 4 + 1 + 3 + 9 + 5 + 3 + 8 + 6 + 3
 + 4 + 5 + 5 + 5 + 5 + 5 + 4 + 2 + 4 + 7
}}
| top point scorer =  Dan Parks (Glasgow)(197 points)
| top try scorer = Darren Daniel (Llanelli Scarlets)Barry Davies (Llanelli Scarlets)Jamie Heaslip (Leinster)Andrew Trimble (Ulster)(7 tries)
| website = www.rabodirectpro12.com
| prevseason = 2005–06
| nextseason = 2007–08
}}
The 2006–07 Celtic League (known as the 2006–07 Magners League for sponsorship reasons) was the sixth Celtic League season and the first with Magners as title sponsor. The season commenced on 1 September and was completed on 12 May.

The teams competing remained the same as the previous season with four Irish provinces; Munster, Leinster, Connacht and 2005–06 champions Ulster, three Scottish regions; Edinburgh, Border Reivers and Glasgow Warriors and four Welsh regions; Llanelli Scarlets, Cardiff Blues, Ospreys and Newport Gwent Dragons.

The league was won for the second time in three seasons by the Ospreys, with a final-day win over the Borders, playing their last match, as the Scottish Rugby Union had announced that the Borders would not exist in the following season. Cardiff Blues finished second, making this the only season of the tournament (as of 2021) in which no Irish team made the top two of the United Rugby Championship and predecessor tournaments.

Teams

Pre-season
Ulster began the season as the reigning champions whilst Munster are Heineken Cup champions of the 2005–06 season. Prior to the season commencing it was announced by the Irish Rugby Football Union that some of their internationals were to be rested during part of the season as the Rugby World Cup takes place at the end. This would include the first four matches of the season, to allow for recovery from the June internationals. Those who did not play much during the internationals may return sooner. Major signings during the off-season include Justin Marshall for the Ospreys and Stephen Jones for the Scarlets. The free weekend scheme, where each team that did not compete in a match on a weekend due to the odd number of teams in the league would receive 4 points, was scrapped.

Table

Results

Round 1

Round 2

Welsh Round 1
 All-Welsh Round 5 matches played early to allow Welsh teams to play in the Anglo-Welsh Cup.

Round 3

Round 4

Round 5

Round 6

Round 7

Round 8

Round 9

Round 10

Round 11

 This match was postponed from Round 6 to allow Welsh teams to play in the Anglo-Welsh Cup.

Round 12

Round 13

Round 14

Round 15

Round 16

Round 17

Round 18

Round 19

Rescheduled matches
 These match were rescheduled to allow Cardiff and Ospreys to play in the Anglo-Welsh Cup semi-finals.

Round 20

Rescheduled Match
 All-Welsh match rescheduled to allow Welsh teams to play in the Anglo-Welsh Cup.

Round 21

Rescheduled Match
 All-Welsh match rescheduled to allow Welsh teams to play in the Anglo-Welsh Cup.

Round 22

Leading scorers
Note: Flags to the left of player names indicate national team as has been defined under IRB eligibility rules, or primary nationality for players who have not yet earned international senior caps. Players may hold one or more non-IRB nationalities.

Top points scorers

Top try scorers

Broadcast rights
Television rights for the league are split between three broadcasters, BBC Wales, S4C and Setanta Sports. At the start of the season it was announced that the BBC Wales and S4C had extended their contract to show Celtic League until the end of the 2009/10 season.

Notes

External links
 2006–07 Celtic League at BBC

References

 
2006-07
 
2006–07 in Irish rugby union
2006–07 in Welsh rugby union
2006–07 in Scottish rugby union